The Caledonia River is a perennial river of the West Gippsland catchment, located in the Alpine region of the Australian state of Victoria.

Features and location
The Caledonia River rises below Minogues Lookout within the Snowy Range of the Great Dividing Range. The river flows generally south then south by west and then south, joined by the five tributaries including the Caledonia River East Branch (which is also joined by the Caledonia River Middle Branch), before reaching its confluence with the Macalister River, near The Sisters, in the Shire of Wellington. The river descends  over its  course.

See also

Rivers of Victoria

References

External links
 
 

West Gippsland catchment
Rivers of Gippsland (region)
Victorian Alps